2000 Today was an internationally broadcast television special to commemorate the beginning of the Year 2000. This program included New Year's Eve celebrations, musical performances, and other features from participating nations.

Most international broadcasts such as the Olympic Games coverage originate from a limited area for worldwide distribution. 2000 Today was rare in that its live and taped programming originated from member countries and represented all continents including Europe, Asia, Africa, South America and North America & Oceania.

Development
2000 Today was conceived as part of the Millennium celebrations, given the numerical significance of the change from 1999 to 2000. 2000 Today was commissioned by the BBC as one of the five main millennium projects that were broadcast across TV, radio and online services throughout 1999 and 2000.

Most nations that observe the Islamic calendar were not involved in 2000 Today. However, a few predominantly Muslim nations were represented among the programme's worldwide broadcasters such as Egypt (ERTU) and Indonesia (RCTI). Africa was minimally represented in 2000 Today. The only participating nations from that continent were Egypt and South Africa. Portugal-based RTP África distributed the programme to some African nations.

Antarctica was mentioned on the programme schedule, although it was unclear if 2000 Today coverage was recorded or live.

Production
The programme was produced and televised by an international consortium of 60 broadcasters, headed by the BBC in the UK and WGBH (Now known as GBH) in Boston, United States. The editorial board also included representatives from ABC (Australia), CBC (Canada), CCTV (China), ETC (Egypt), RTL (Germany), SABC (South Africa), TF1 (France), TV Asahi (Japan), TV Globo (Brazil) and ABC (USA). The BBC provided the production hub for receiving and distributing the 78 international satellite feeds required for this broadcast. The idents for the programme were designed in the UK by Lambie-Nairn and the BBC for use by all the participating broadcasters taking part in the event. The linking theme throughout all the idents and promotions was a distinctively shaped stone engraved with the year 2000. The themes were: desert, fire, ice, lasers and water; plus a special BBC News ident.

Up to 5,000 staff worked on 2000 Today, 1,500 of them in BBC Television Centre in West London, where all eight television studios were used during the 28-hour broadcast. Each participant financed and produced its own contributions and shared the core costs proportionately to its size and wealth. It is estimated to have cost $6 million to produce and broadcast.

2000 Today was nominated for "Best Visual Effects and Graphic Design" at the 2000 British Academy Television Craft Awards.

Program timeline
2000 Today's core international broadcast was 28 hours long, following the beginning of the New Year 2000 across the world's time zones. The programme was tailored by individual broadcasters to provide local content and hosts.

The broadcast on BBC One in the United Kingdom started on 31 December 1999 at 09:15 UTC. 2000 Today started its international feed at 09:40 UTC, with the Kiribati Line Islands celebrating the arrival of 2000 at 10:00 UTC.

Most of Europe celebrated midnight at 23:00 UTC. Broadcasting celebrations from many countries under Central European Time posed a particularly complex broadcast challenge. 2000 Today chose to rapidly air each nation's midnight observances in succession, using tape delays in most cases. This hour of the broadcast included a blessing by Pope John Paul II from Vatican City and the pyrotechnic display of the Eiffel Tower in Paris. ABC 2000 Today however decided to use Paris for its broadcast in the United States while French broadcasters TF1 and France 2 covered the festivities live from the Eiffel Tower. In addition, Italian broadcaster Rai used the pope's blessing for its Millennium - La Notte Del 2000 broadcast.

2000 Today's international feed finished shortly after midnight celebrations were broadcast from Samoa on 1 January 2000 at 11:00 UTC. BBC One in the United Kingdom continued to broadcast with national features until 13:30. Later the same evening, it aired a two-hour highlights programme, The Best of 2000 Today.

Personalities

National hosts

 Argentina (Canal 13 – El Día del Milenio)
 Lito Vitale
 Coro de Buenos Aires
 Julio Bocca and Eleonora Cassano
 Mónica Cahen D'Anvers and César Mascetti (presenters of Telenoche)
 Mercedes Sosa and Alejandro Lerner
 Australia (ABC Australia)
 George Negus
 Maxine McKew
 Deborah Kennedy
 Mike Bailey
 Andrea Stretton
 Caroline Baum
 John Lombard
 Jennifer Byrne
 James O'Loghlin
 Daniel Marsden
 Peter Thompson
 Kathy Bowlen
 Brazil 
(Rede Record)
 Boris Casoy
 Eliana
 José Luiz Datena
 Eleonora Paschoal
 Virgínia Nowicki
 Dalton Vigh
 Fábio Jr
 Raul Gil
 (BAND)
 Otaviano Costa
 Márcia Peltier
 Fernando Vannucci
 Susana Alves
 Marcos Hummel
 Luciano do Valle
 Silvia Poppovic
 Canada
 (CBC)
 Peter Mansbridge (primary host, most hours)
 Laurie Brown (00:00–08:00 UTC, with Mansbridge)
 Alison Smith (13:00–18:00 UTC)
 (Radio-Canada)
 At the time, technicians at Radio-Canada were on strike. Transmissions were seen as scheduled, but using only the main feed from the BBC, with a French voice-over. Also, as a consequence, 2000 footage from Canada was scarce on SRC's presentation, while footage from Quebec was not available at all worldwide (though the CBC did manage to get the only Quebec coverage on their own network—a video shot of midnight fireworks in Hull, Quebec, shot from Ottawa, Ontario).
 Chile (TVN)
 Jennifer Warner
 Mauricio Bustamante
 Jorge Hevia
 Margot Kahl
 Karen Doggenweiler
 Felipe Camiroaga
 Pedro Carcuro
 Rafael Araneda
 Andrea Molina
 Colombia (RCN Televisión)
 Claudia Gurisatti
 William Calderón
 Iñaki Berrueta
 Czech Republic (Czech Television)

 Marek Beneš
 Vladimír Jiránek
 Karel Gott
 Břetislav Pojar
 Pavel Koutský
 Jiří Lábus
 Ota Jirák
 Václav Postránecký
 Petr Haničinec
 Petr Skoumal
 Jiřina Bohdalová
 Blanka Bohdanová
 Jiri Salamoun
 Karel Cernoch
 Martin Klásek
 Estonia (TV3)
 There was no in-vision commentary or studio used for the broadcast and was aired without commentary between midnight and 6:00 UTC.
 Ene Veiksaar (9:40–12:00 UTC)
 Lauri Hussar (9:40–12:00 UTC)
 Jüri Aarma (12:00–15:00 UTC)
 Priit Aimla (12:00–15:00 UTC)
 Rein Lang (15:00–18:00 UTC)
 Kiur Aarma (15:00–18:00 UTC)
 Harri Tiido (18:00–21:00 UTC)
 Vello Rand (18:00–21:00 UTC)
 Mart Luik (21:00–00:00 UTC)
 Märt Treier (06:00–09:00 UTC)
 Kätlin Kontor (06:00–09:00 UTC)
 Enn Eesmaa (09:00–11:00 UTC)
 France (TF1 – Le Millénium)
 Jean-Claude Narcy
 Valérie Benaïm
 Christophe Dechavanne
 Carole Rousseau
 Jean-Pierre Pernaut
 Évelyne Dhéliat
 Claire Chazal
 Patrick Poivre d'Arvor
 Charles Villeneuve
 Germany (RTL Television)
 Peter Kloeppel
 Antonia Rados
 Bernd Fuchs
 Heiner Bremer
 Michael Karr
 Birgit von Bentzel
 Ireland (RTÉ One – Millennium Eve: Celebrate 2000)
 Miriam O'Callaghan
 Mark Little
 Geri Maye
 Pat Kenny
 Liz Bonnin
 Joe Duffy
 Israel (Keshet 2)
 Miki Haimovich
 Jacob Elon
 Italy (Rai – Millennium - La notte del 2000)
 Bruno Pizzul
 Monica Maggioni
 Carlo Conti
 Gigi Proietti
 Valeria Marini
 Clarissa Burt
 South Korea (MBC)
 Sohn Suk-hee
 Shim Hye-jin
 Mexico
 (Televisa)
 Ernesto Laguardia
 Mayra Saucedo
 Marco Antonio Regil
 Guilliermo Ochoa
 Guilliermo Ortega
 Lolita Ayala
 (Once TV)
 Adriana Perez Cañedo
 Jose Angel Dominguez
 Sergio Uzeta
 Christina Pacheco
 Rocío Brauer
 Lilia Silvia Hernandez
 Netherlands (NOS)
 Astrid Kersseboom
 Jeroen Overbeek
 Philippines (GMA Network)
 Mike Enriquez
 Jessica Soho
 Mel Tiangco
 Jay Sonza
 German Moreno
 Angelique Lazo
 Vicky Morales
 Paolo Bediones
 Karen Davila 
 Arnold Clavio
 Mickey Ferriols
 Miriam Quiambao
 Ryan Agoncillo
 KC Montero
 Suzi Entrata
 Kara David
 Bernadette Sembrano
 Luchi Cruz-Valdes
 Ninna Castro
 Lyn Ching
 Margaux Salcedo
 Arnell Ignacio
 Susan Enriquez
 Tisha Silang
 Antoinette Taus
 Francis Magalona
 Dingdong Dantes
 Martin Andanar
 Butch Francisco
 Tito Sotto
 Vic Sotto
 Joey de Leon
 Portugal (RTP)
 José Rodrigues dos Santos
 Manuela Moura Guedes
 Spain (Televisión Española)
 Jesús Álvarez Cervantes
 Alfredo Urdaci
 Helena Resano
 Ramón García
 Anne Igartiburu
 Nuria Roca
 Ukraine
 Vlad Ryashyn (Inter)
 Svitlana Leontyeva (Inter)
 Yuriy Makarov (1+1)
 United Kingdom (BBC One)
 David Dimbleby
 Michael Parkinson
 Michael Buerk
 Peter Sissons
 Peter Snow
 Philippa Forrester 
 Jamie Theakston
 Gaby Roslin
 Huw Edwards
 Shauna Lowry
 Tim Vincent
 Siân Lloyd
 Noel Thompson
 Kate Thornton
 Fergal Keane
 Tony Robinson
 Jackie Bird
 Kirsty Wark
 Sian Williams
 John Kettley
 Dale Winton
 Steve Wilson
 Emma Ledden
 Katy Hill
 Alan Dedicoat
 John Cunliffe]
 United States (ABC – ABC 2000 Today)
 Peter Jennings
 Barbara Walters
 Diane Sawyer
 Charles Gibson
 Elizabeth Vargas
 Jack Ford
 Sam Donaldson
 Connie Chung
 Cokie Roberts
 Deborah Roberts
 Carole Simpson
 Morton Dean
 Dick Clark
 Vietnam (VTV)
 Nguyễn Thanh Lâm
 Thu Uyên

Music performers
Musical artists were part of the 2000 Today broadcast, including:

Africa
 Jean Michel Jarre – Giza pyramid complex, Egypt
Asia
 Maki Ohguro – Nara, Japan
 Regine Velasquez – Makati, Philippines
Europe
 Björk – Reykjavík, Iceland
 Charlotte Church – United Kingdom
 The Corrs – London, England, United Kingdom
 Eurythmics – United Kingdom
 Ronan Keating – Dublin, Ireland
 Manic Street Preachers – Cardiff, Wales, United Kingdom
 Martine McCutcheon – United Kingdom
 Natalie MacMaster – Ireland
 Robyn – Sweden
 Ruslana – Kyiv, Ukraine
 Simply Red – London, England, United Kingdom
 Spice Girls  – London, England, United Kingdom
North America
 Bee Gees – Miami, Florida, United States
 Juan Gabriel – Mexico
 Great Big Sea – St. John's, Newfoundland, Canada
 Kenny G – New York City, New York, United States
 Phish – Big Cypress Indian Reservation, Florida, United States
 The Tragically Hip – Toronto, Ontario, Canada
Oceania
 Split Enz – Auckland, New Zealand
 Kiri Te Kanawa – Gisborne, New Zealand
South America
 Los Fabulosos Cadillacs – Ushuaia, Argentina
 Alejandro Lerner and Mercedes Sosa – Iguazú Falls, Argentina
 Lito Vitale and Estudio Coral de Buenos Aires – Perito Moreno Glacier, Argentina

Participating broadcasters

The following nations broadcast 2000 Today. Some nations were licensees of the broadcast, rather than formal members of the broadcast consortium.

Argentina: El Trece
Australia: ABC
Austria: ORF
Belgium: VRT (Dutch) and RTBF (French)
Brazil: Rede Record and BAND
Canada: CBC (English) and Radio-Canada (French)
Cape Verde: RTP África
Colombia: RCN TV and Teveandina Canal 13
Caribbean: CBU
Chile: TVN and Chilevisión
China: CCTV
Czech Republic: ČT
Denmark: DR and TV3
Ecuador: Ecuavisa, Teleamazonas, Telesistema, TC Televisión, Gamavisión, SíTV and ETV Telerama
Egypt: ETV
Estonia: TV3
Fiji: Fiji TV
Finland: YLE
France: TF1
Germany: RTL
Greece: ERT
Guinea-Bissau: RTP África
Hong Kong: STAR TV, ATV, TVB, Phoenix Television, and CETV
Hungary: MTV (MTV1, selected coverage; MTV2, full coverage)
Iceland: IBC
India: Doordarshan and Zee TV 	
Indonesia: RCTI
Ireland: RTÉ
Israel: IBA and ICP
Italy: RAI, Italia 1, Rete 4 and Canale 5
Japan: TV Asahi
Jordan: JRTC
Lebanon: MTV
Lithuania: TV3
Macau: TDM (possibly also Channel 32 and Channel 30)
Malaysia: RTM, STMB, Mega TV and Astro
Malta: Super One
Mexico: Once TV
Mozambique: RTP África
Netherlands: NPO
New Zealand: TV3
Norway: NRK and TV3
Oman: Oman TV
Panama: Telemetro
Paraguay: Telefuturo and La Tele
Peru: Panamericana Televisión, América Televisión, Frecuencia Latina, ATV and Global Televisión
Philippines: GMA Network
Poland: TVP
Portugal: RTP
Romania: Antena 1 (licensee)
Russia: VGTRK and Prometey AST
Samoa: Samoa TV
São Tomé and Príncipe: RTP África
Singapore: TCS, CNA, STV12 and SCV
Slovakia:  (licensee)
Slovenia: POP TV (licensee)
South Africa: SABC
South Korea: MBC
Spain: TVE
Sri Lanka: MTV
Sweden: TV3 and SVT
Switzerland: SRG SSR
Taiwan: TTV, CTV, CTS, FTV and PTS
Thailand: BBTV Channel 7
Tonga: TBC
Ukraine: Novyi Kanal, Inter, 1+1
United Kingdom: BBC
United States: ABC and PBS
Uruguay: Teledoce and TNU
Vietnam: VTV and HTV
Venezuela: RCTV

Recorded time broadcasts 
Longest time broadcasts: HTV (34 hours)
 Shortest time broadcasts: VTV (6 hours)

Ratings
2000 Today had an estimated worldwide audience of 800 million people, with an audience of 12.6 million people on the BBC alone.

Soundtrack

2000 Today: A World Symphony for the Millennium is a television soundtrack album of music commissioned by the BBC for its internationally broadcast television special, 2000 Today and released by Sony Classical Records in December 1999. The music was composed and conducted by multi award-winning composer Tan Dun, and performed by the BBC Concert Orchestra, London Voices choir, New London Children's Choir, and a group of world instrument performers from around the world. It was featured on PBS and ABC throughout the promotions leading up to the broadcast and throughout the broadcast itself, providing musical "stepping stones" from country to country, culture to culture, day to night.

The programme's theme song was a cover version of Bob Marley's song "One Love" performed by the Gipsy Kings, Ziggy Marley, Tsidii Le Loka and the Boys Choir of Harlem. This version was released as a single in Europe. "One Love" was performed live by Gipsy Kings as part of the broadcast from Miami, Florida.

Track listing

Personnel
Tan Dun – composer, conductor, producer
Charles Harbutt – engineer, post production
Mary Lou Humphrey – liner notes
Photonica – photographer
FPG International – photographer
Grace Row – producer

See also
ABC 2000 Today, the commercial American broadcast
Millennium Eve: Celebrate 2000, the Irish broadcast
Millennium Live, the supposed nemesis of the successful 2000 Today broadcast
New Year's Eve

References

External links

CBC archive of New Year's Eve 2000

New Year's television specials
1999 television specials
2000 television specials
Simulcasts
Turn of the third millennium
International broadcasting
International telecommunications